The 1981 election for Mayor of Los Angeles took place on April 7, 1981. Incumbent Tom Bradley was re-elected over former Mayor Sam Yorty. The election was a third rematch between Bradley and Yorty, the other two being in 1969 and 1973. It would be the last time a Mayor would be elected to a third term, as voters amended the city charter in 1993 to implement a two-term limit for the office of Mayor.

Municipal elections in California, including Mayor of Los Angeles, are officially nonpartisan; candidates' party affiliations do not appear on the ballot.

Election 
Yorty had been a last-minute challenger, saying that he had been urged to run after LAPD Chief Daryl Gates announced that he would not challenge Bradley. Yorty said that he "sees the crime issue as the key to the contest" and was seen as injecting racism into the race by saying to a group of businessmen that "black people are really racist. They vote for black people because they're black." Bradley dedeated Yorty and the other candidates in a landslide, with some calling the election a "lackluster affair."

Results

References and footnotes

External links
 Office of the City Clerk, City of Los Angeles

1981
Los Angeles
Los Angeles mayoral election
Mayoral election
Los Angeles mayoral election